Héctor Alejandro Galindo Amezcua (January 14, 1906 – February 1, 1999), better known as Alejandro Galindo, was a Mexican screenwriter and film director.

Selected filmography

Director
 While Mexico Sleeps (1938)
 Neither Blood Nor Sand (1941)
 Red Konga (1943)
 A Family Like Many Others (1949)
 Confessions of a Taxi Driver (1949)
 Doña Perfecta (1951)
 They Say I'm a Communist (1951)
 Los dineros del diablo (1953)
 The Last Round (1953)
 Golden Legs (1958)
The Life of Agustín Lara (1959)

References

Bibliography
 Spicer, Andrew. Historical Dictionary of Film Noir. Scarecrow Press, 2010.

External links

1906 births
1999 deaths
Best Director Ariel Award winners
Mexican film directors
People from Monterrey
20th-century Mexican screenwriters
20th-century Mexican male writers